The 1959–60 season was the 4th season of the Liga Española de Baloncesto. R. Madrid won their title.

Teams

Venues and locations

League table

Relegation playoffs

League table

Individual statistics

Points

Notes
1. Hesperia withdrawn, farm club of Real Madrid , and Canoe NC not relegated.
2. Helios withdrawn, Zaragoza was promoted.

References

ACB.com 
linguasport 

Liga Española de Baloncesto (1957–1983) seasons
1959–60 in Spanish basketball